In enzymology, a N-methylalanine dehydrogenase is an enzyme that catalyzes the chemical reaction

N-methyl-L-alanine + H2O + NADP+  pyruvate + methylamine + NADPH + H+

The 3 substrates of this enzyme are N-methyl-L-alanine, H2O, and NADP+, whereas its 4 products are pyruvate, methylamine, NADPH, and H+.

This enzyme belongs to the family of oxidoreductases, specifically those acting on the CH-NH2 group of donors with NAD+ or NADP+ as acceptor.  The systematic name of this enzyme class is N-methyl-L-alanine:NADP+ oxidoreductase (demethylating, deaminating).

References

 

EC 1.4.1
NADPH-dependent enzymes
Enzymes of unknown structure